Nenad Marković (born 6 June 1968) is a Bosnian former professional basketball player and current head coach for JDA Dijon of French LNB Pro A.

Playing career
Born in Doboj to a Bosnian Serb father and a Bosnian Croat mother, Marković started his playing career at KK Igman Ilidža, before being scouted by U-16 KK Bosna Sarajevo under Mladen "Makso" Ostojić. He played for a number of years in KK Bosna's youth teams alongside players such as Predrag Danilović, Dževad Alihodžić, Senad Begović, Adis Bećiragić, etc. Marković broke into the first team and become a regular starter during the 1989–90 season. At that season's end his improvement was recognized with a call-up to the Yugoslav national team under famous coach Dušan "Duda" Ivković. However, Marković was not ultimately selected for the FIBA World Championship side sent to Argentina in August 1990, which Yugoslavia won. Marković nonetheless continued to improve at club level, featuring regularly for KK Bosna over the next two seasons, before the war broke out in his native Bosnia and Herzegovina.

For the next 14 seasons Marković played all over Europe, including in Italy, Spain, Israel, France, and Greece. In France, while playing for Limoges, he had the honour of playing in the French league All-Star game, during which he won the three-point shootout competition. He also played in many notable matches for the new Bosnian national team, including in two matches against Croatia in November 1997 and November 1998 that helped make his name as one of Bosnia's most prominent athletes. before eventually returning to KK Bosna to end his playing career.

Eventually, in 2004, Marković returned to KK Bosna to end his playing career, becoming the first Bosnian basketball player to return to his hometown club in this way. He retired from the game in 2006, having played for 18 years.

Coaching career
Following retirement, Marković worked as a coach for the Bosnia and Herzegovina national basketball team. He became head coach of KK Bosna in 2007, but resigned on failing to achieve his announced goal of leading them to the national championship title.

In October 2007, Marković became the head coach of Greek club Panionios, whom he led to qualification for the EuroLeague, a goal the club had not achieved in the previous 12 seasons. His contract, however, was not renewed, and he was replaced in summer 2008 for the following 2008–09 season by Aleksandar Trifunović.

End of July 2009, Marković again has become head coach of Greek club Panionios Athens.

In early February 2013, Marković took the reins of Greek club KAOD from the town of Drama fighting for survival in the Greek League. Marković took over from Georgios Kalafatakis, who left the team after 15 league matches in 12th league spot (out of 14) with the 5-10 record.

On 24 November 2014 he signed with Trabzonspor of the Basketbol Süper Ligi (BSL).

On 5 July 2016 he signed with Pınar Karşıyaka of the Basketbol Süper Ligi (BSL).

On 21 June 2017 he signed with Iberostar Tenerife of the Liga ACB. He won the FIBA Intercontinental Cup championship in 2017.

On 28 November 2017 he signed with Gaziantep of the Basketbol Süper Ligi (BSL).

On 10 June 2021 he signed with  JDA Dijon of French LNB Pro A.

Achievements

As player
 Bosna: (1)
 Bosnian Cup: (2005)

As coach
 Iberostar Tenerife: (1)
 FIBA Intercontinental Cup: (2017)

Political career
Marković joined the Social Democratic Party (SDP BiH) in Bosnia-Herzegovina.

On 29 January 2009, he was appointed deputy mayor of Bosnia-Herzegovina's capital Sarajevo, working under mayor Alija Behmen, also of SDP BiH.

In July 2009, Marković went back to coaching with a job at Panionios. For a few months, he continued with the deputy mayoral job in parallel, but in November 2009 handed in his resignation, which was accepted by the Sarajevo city council.

References

External links
Liga ACB profile
Eurobasket.com profile

1968 births
Living people
ABA League players
Basketbol Süper Ligi head coaches
Bosnia and Herzegovina basketball coaches
Bosnia and Herzegovina men's basketball players
Bosnia and Herzegovina expatriate basketball people in Israel
CB 1939 Canarias coaches
CB Estudiantes players
CB Murcia players
Expatriate sportspeople in Israel
Gaziantep Basketbol coaches
Hapoel Eilat basketball players
Hapoel Tel Aviv B.C. players
Israeli Basketball Premier League players
Joventut Badalona players
KAOD B.C. coaches
Karşıyaka basketball coaches
KK Bosna Royal coaches
Liga ACB players
Limoges CSP players
Lugano Tigers players
Olympiacos B.C. players
Panionios B.C. coaches
Panionios B.C. players
People from Doboj
Point guards
Shooting guards
Valencia Basket players